One Man's Law is a 1940 American Western film directed by George Sherman and written by Bennett Cohen and Jack Natteford. The film stars Don "Red" Barry, Janet Waldo, George Cleveland, Dub Taylor, Edmund Cobb and Dick Elliott. The film was released on June 29, 1940, by Republic Pictures.

Plot

Cast 
Don "Red" Barry as Jack Summers
Janet Waldo as Joyce Logan
George Cleveland as Judge Wingate
Dub Taylor as Nevady
Edmund Cobb as Red Mathews
Dick Elliott as Prendergast
James H. McNamara as George Martin
Robert Frazer as Russell Fletcher
Rex Lease as Spike Hudkins
Edward Peil, Sr. as Joel Winters
Fred Toones as Snowflake

References

External links
 

1940 films
1940s English-language films
American Western (genre) films
1940 Western (genre) films
Republic Pictures films
Films directed by George Sherman
American black-and-white films
1940s American films